Toby: The Secret Mine is a 2015 puzzle-platform game developed by Lukáš Navrátil. It  resembles Limbo.

Gameplay
Toby: The Secret Mine is a side-scrolling puzzle platformer with black silhouette graphics. The gameplay is very similar to Limbo but its atmosphere is much less dark and world is much more colorful. The player controls Toby throughout the game, guiding him through multiple levels set in varied environments such as forests, caves, a mine, blizzard etc. There are puzzles on the route that the player must solve to progress. There are also multiple traps that the player can easily overlook unless alert. These traps vary in each environment with the blizzard levels focussing heavily on timed platforming. There are also kidnapped friends that are hidden throughout the levels adding an element of exploration. The game consists of 21 separate levels in all.

Plot
Toby lives in a nameless town whose residents are being kidnapped by a red-eyed cats. Toby decides set up for an adventurous journey to save his friends.

Toby pursues gets through a Lost Mine full of dangers and traps set by kidnappers. Toby eventually gets to hideout of kidnappers and defeats their leader. The leader offers Toby his crown and player is given choice to accept the crown or kill the kidnapper.

If he takes the crown, Toby's eyes turn red and Toby becomes the new leader of kidnappers. His friends turn evil too and Toby is seen standing on a cliff as his homeworld is burning.

If Toby kills the kidnapper, his friends are freed and they return home.

Development
The game was in development for one and a half years. It was inspired by Limbo, Nihilumbra, Type:Rider and other games. Navrátil worked on the game alone. He had to deal with the difficulty of his lack of experience. He eventually finished the game and in October 2015 it was released on Steam via Steam Greenlight. An iOS version is currently planned. The Nintendo Switch version will be released in Japan on July 9, 2020.

Reception
KeenGamer called Toby: The Secret Mine "a beautifully crafted puzzle platforming game." The review praised the game's aesthetic and gameplay including the puzzle sections. Criticism was reserved for the lack of story and for the unintuitive nature of some of the sections. The game was rated 6/10.

Gone With the Win Was critical of the similarities between Toby: The Secret Mine and Limbo but praised its charm and gameplay. It also criticised the guesswork required in the puzzles but gave the game a positive review overall with a 7/10.

References

External links
 

2015 video games
Side-scrolling platform games
Puzzle-platform games
Indie video games
Single-player video games
Video games developed in the Czech Republic
Video games with alternate endings
Dark fantasy video games
PlayStation 4 games
Steam Greenlight games
Windows games
MacOS games
IOS games
Xbox One games
Video games with silhouette graphics
Android (operating system) games
Wii U eShop games
Linux games